The U.S. Custom House and Post Office is a court house at 815 Olive Street in downtown St. Louis, Missouri.

It was designed by architects Alfred B. Mullett, William Appleton Potter, and James G. Hill, and was constructed between 1873 and 1884. Located at the intersection of Eighth and Olive Streets, it is one of four surviving Federal office buildings designed by Mullett.  The others are the Eisenhower Executive Office Building in Washington, D.C., the Century Post Office in Raleigh, N.C. and the U.S. Custom House in Portland, Me. It is in the Second Empire architectural style popular in the post Civil-War era. Mullett's other Second Empire buildings in Boston, Cincinnati, New York City and Philadelphia have been demolished.

Description
The basement connects to a tunnel under 8th Street that was used for the delivery of mail to the post office.

Interior structure is a mixture of wrought and cast iron, supporting arched brick floors in a system that was referred to at the time of construction as "fireproof." The building's windows were provided with fireproof shutters.

The principal facade is the southern, along Olive Street, which features an iron mansard dome. Each street elevation features a central pavilion which in turn bears a portico. The Olive Street elevation's pediment is ornamented by the 1877 sculpture "America at War and America at Peace" by Daniel Chester French, his first major commission. Double-hung windows are set in cast iron frames throughout the building.  Cast iron trim and molding frames interior sides of windows and doors. Interior detailing was extensive, with art glass panels, mosaic tile floors and bronze door knobs imprinted with the Seal of the United States. Thirty offices on the second, third and fourth floors featured red Bologna marble fireplace mantels.

History
The Customhouse and Post Office was constructed under the supervision of architect James G, Hill and construction superintendent Thomas Walsh, for a total cost of $5,686,854.68. The third floor of building was occupied by the U.S District Court until 1935, when it moved to new quarters at 12th and Market streets. The Post Office remained until 1970, occupying the main basement and the first floor. A number of Federal agencies were housed on the fourth floor.

The United States District Court for the Eastern District of Missouri met at this courthouse until 1935, and the U.S. Circuit Court that district met here until that court was abolished in 1912. The U.S. Court of Appeals for the Eighth Circuit met here from 1891 until 1935. It was transferred from the U.S. General Services Administration to the State of Missouri through the Federal Historic Surplus Property Program in September 2004. It is currently a mixed-use facility serving federal, state, and private purposes. The building was to the downtown campus for Webster University until the campus was relocated to the adjacent Arcade Building upon the completion of its renovation in late 2015. Soon after, Lindenwood University announced it would relocate its downtown campus to Webster University's former space. The Missouri Court of Appeals, Eastern District, also occupies the building.

See also
National Register of Historic Places listings in Downtown and Downtown West St. Louis
List of National Historic Landmarks in Missouri

References

External links

 at the National Park Service's NRHP database

Government buildings completed in 1884
National Historic Landmarks in Missouri
Historic American Buildings Survey in Missouri
Buildings and structures in St. Louis
Former federal courthouses in the United States
Alfred B. Mullett buildings
Second Empire architecture in Missouri
Courthouses on the National Register of Historic Places in Missouri
Post office buildings on the National Register of Historic Places in Missouri
Landmarks of St. Louis
Custom houses in the United States
National Register of Historic Places in St. Louis
Custom houses on the National Register of Historic Places
Downtown St. Louis
1884 establishments in Missouri
Tourist attractions in St. Louis